Okkie van Greunen (28 November 1933 – 17 May 1987) was a South African modern pentathlete. He competed at the 1956 and 1960 Summer Olympics.

References

1933 births
1987 deaths
People from Siyancuma Local Municipality
South African male modern pentathletes
Olympic modern pentathletes of South Africa
Modern pentathletes at the 1956 Summer Olympics
Modern pentathletes at the 1960 Summer Olympics